Arauquita is a town and municipality in the Arauca Department, Colombia. As of 2020, the municipality has a population of 56,209.

Miguel Matus Caile, the politician and historian, was born in Arauquita.

References

Municipalities of Arauca Department